Linkous–Kipps House is a historic home in Blacksburg, Montgomery County, Virginia.  It is a two-story, "L"-shaped log structure with shouldered brick chimneys at three locations. The oldest section dates to the early-19th century. It has a hall-parlor plan. Also on the property is a contributing springbox and frame springhouse.

It was listed on the National Register of Historic Places in 1989.

References

Houses on the National Register of Historic Places in Virginia
Houses in Montgomery County, Virginia
National Register of Historic Places in Montgomery County, Virginia
Blacksburg, Virginia